Myrsine lessertiana, the kōlea lau nui, is a species of colicwood that is endemic to Hawaii.

Uses
Native Hawaiians used kōlea lau nui wood to make papa olonā (Touchardia latifolia scrapers), kua kuku (kapa anvils), pou (house posts), kaola (beams) and pale (gunwales) and manu (ornamental end pieces) for waa (outrigger canoes).  Kōlea lau nui bark was boiled in water to make hili kōlea (a red dye), which was then used on kapa. Its leaves have been used for visions and revelation, and when smoked produce a high euphoric effect and visuals similar to those of LSD.

References

lessertiana
Plants described in 1841
Endemic flora of Hawaii
Trees of Hawaii
Flora without expected TNC conservation status